Devan Ekambaram (born 25 December 1975) is an Indian American film playback singer, actor and composer. He began his career as a playback singer in Tamil films and later branched out to many other south Indian languages as well like Telugu, Kannada and has sung for over 500 films.

Education
Devan pursued his higher school studies at the Freehold Township High School, New Jersey. He enrolled and dropped out of Electrical Engineering at the University of Illinois at Urbana–Champaign in his second year.

Playback singing career
Devan began his singing career in the year 1999, when he received an unexpected call from Academy Award winning composer A. R. Rahman's assistants for a voice audition. He then, went on to record his maiden song "O Maria" for the film Kadhalar Dhinam along with Yugendran. The song proved to be a hit among all sections and thereafter he received several offers from many other Southern music directors.

Devan's second huge hit came in his short piece mellifluous rendition in "Ore Nyabagam" from Minnale (2001) composed by Harris Jayaraj. Thereafter he sang many popular tracks in Tamil and Telugu films under the compositions of Ilayaraja, Vidhyasagar, Deva, Yuvan Shankar Raja, Karthik Raja and others. The song "Anbil Avan" from Vinnaithaandi Varuvaayaa composed by A. R. Rahman ruled the music chart for months.

Most of his songs are for the music director Harris Jayaraj and all the songs Devan has sung for him have received a good response from the audience.

Recently, he has sung a peppy number called "Nahna na Na" for Director Venkat Prabhu's Biriyani Which was composed by Yuvan Shankar Raja has become a viral hit from the day it was released. Two different remix versions of the song called "New Jack Swing Mix" and "The Extended Mix" also received a massive response.

His latest song is " Yennai Arindhaal " from the movie Yennai Arindhaal where he again sings for the music director Harris Jayaraj. This song was written by lyricist Thamarai. It is another peppy number.

Music direction
Devan debuted as a music director in the 2010 film Bale Pandiya. The music album was received with a mixed response. Besides this film, Devan has composed for several short Tamil album songs and has also sung for them.
 Bale Pandiya (2010)
 Pattarai (2022)

Acting
Devan has also acted in few Tamil films as a character artist. The prominent ones being Parthiban Kanavu (debut film), Unnale Unnale and Jayam Kondaan. He also dubbed for various characters in films like Little John (film) for the main character, John McKenzie, Suresh in Dasavathaaram and Dong Lee and other Chinese characters in 7aum Arivu.

Discography

Tamil Songs

Telugu Songs

References

External links
 

Living people
American people of Indian Tamil descent
American male singers
Tamil playback singers
Singers from New Jersey
People from Freehold Borough, New Jersey
Tamil singers
1975 births